Henri le Marié (18 April 1878 – 1 August 1953) was a French sports shooter. He competed in the men's trap event at the 1912 Summer Olympics.

References

1878 births
1953 deaths
French male sport shooters
Olympic shooters of France
Shooters at the 1912 Summer Olympics
People from Laval, Mayenne
Sportspeople from Mayenne